United Nations Security Council Resolution 2231 was a 20 July 2015 resolution endorsing the Joint Comprehensive Plan of Action on the nuclear program of Iran. It sets out an inspection process and schedule while also preparing for the removal of United Nations sanctions against Iran. The 15 nations on the Security Council unanimously endorsed the resolution, which had been negotiated by the permanent members of the United Nations Security Council—China, France, Russia, the United Kingdom, and the United States—plus Germany, the European Union, and Iran.

Iran reaction
After the resolution, the Iranian Foreign Affairs minister said: ″the Iranian nation should feel fundamental changes in accordance with the UN Security Council Resolution 2231″.

Accusation of Iranian non-compliance

2016 missile tests
On 29 March 2016, the United States, the UK, France, and Germany wrote a joint letter to Secretary-General of the United Nations Ban Ki-moon accusing Iran of "defying" Security Council Resolution 2231 through missile tests conducted since the deal. The letter said the missiles were "inherently capable of delivering nuclear weapons". However, it stopped short of saying the tests were illegal. Resolution 2231 calls for Iran to refrain from activity related to nuclear-capable missiles ("Iran is called upon not to undertake any activity related to ballistic missiles designed to be capable of delivering  nuclear weapons, including launches using such ballistic missile technology"), but according to unnamed diplomats in a Deutsche Welle report, the language is not legally binding and cannot be enforced with punitive measures.

2020 drone attacks
On 9 June 2020, U.N. Secretary-General António Guterres stated in his biennial report to the UNSC on the Iran arms embargo that cruise missiles used in multiple 2019 attacks on Saudi Arabia had Iranian origin. Cruise missiles or drones used in the 2019 Afif attack, the 2019 Abqaiq–Khurais attack and the 2019 Abha International Airport attacks had Iranian origin, as were several items of materiel interdicted by the US in November 2019 and February 2020. Some items were allegedly transferred between February 2016 and April 2018 in a matter possibly "inconsistent" with Resolution 2231:

At the time, US Ambassador to the UN Kelly Craft said that as a result of the Guterres report she would "circulate a draft resolution to extend the arms embargo on Iran soon". Diplomats said Washington could likely face a "tough, messy battle".

2022 trafficking drones to Russia
On 18 October 2022 the U.S. State Department accused Iran of violating Resolution 2231 by selling Shahed 131 and Shahed 136 drones to Russia, agreeing with similar assessments by France and the United Kingdom. Iran denied sending arms for use in the Ukraine war. On 22 October France, Britain and Germany formally called for an investigation by the UN team responsible for UNSCR 2231.

Responding to these accusations, Iran's ambassador to the UN wrote to the UNSC on 19 October and 24 October that this was an erroneous interpretation of paragraph 4 of annex B of the resolution, which clearly states it apples to items that "could contribute to the development of nuclear weapon delivery systems", which these drones could not.

On 26 October, the procedural matter of if a group of member states could request the Secretariat to conduct an investigation rather than the Security Council as a whole deciding the matter was discussed at a meeting of the UNSC, with the United Nations Legal Counsel Miguel de Serpa Soares stating that United Nations Secretary-General and Secretariat staff "must not seek or receive instructions from any Government" but can take note of information brought to its attention.

Motions to snapback sanctions
On 14 August 2020, a proposal by the US to extend arms restrictions on Iran set to expire in October of that year under resolution 2231 was defeated at the Security Council, with only the Dominican Republic voting with the US in favour, while China and Russia voted against. The remaining 11 members of the council, which included UK, German, French, Belgian, and Estonian delegations, abstained from the vote. In response to the defeat, the Iranian ambassador to the United Nations Majid Takht-Ravanchi remarked that "the result of the vote in [the UNSC] on arms embargo against Iran shows—once more—the US' isolation. Council's message: no to unilateralism".

On 19 August 2020, US Secretary of State Mike Pompeo said that his government intends to utilize the so-called snapback provision in ¶11 of the document, in which any member of the JCPOA can "demand the restoration of all UN sanctions". The motion for the snapback, which is intended in case of significant Iranian non-compliance with the resolution, "starts a 30-day clock during which the UNSC must vote affirmatively to continue the sanctions relief that Iran was given in return for curbs on its nuclear program". This UNSC vote "cannot be blocked by a veto".

On 16 September 2020, Elliott Abrams, the US "special envoy for Iran", announced that all UN sanctions would "snap back" at 20:00 EDT on 19 September. Abrams said that "We expect all UN member states to implement their member state responsibilities and respect their obligations to uphold these sanctions. If other nations do not follow it, I think they should be asked... whether they do not think they are weakening the structure of UN sanctions." Other nations advocate a position whereby when the US abrogated the JCPOA it excluded itself from the JCPOA membership and hence no longer can benefit from the JCPOA.

The embargo on conventional Iranian arms ended in October 2020, but the restrictions on Iran regarding missiles and related technologies are in place until October 2023.

See also
United Nations Security Council Resolutions 1696, 1737, 1747, 1803, 1835, and 1929
 The UNSC and the United States resolutions on the Iran Arms

References

External links
Text of the Resolution at undocs.org

 2231
Nuclear program of Iran
 2231
2015 in Iran
July 2015 events
2020 in international relations
Iran–Saudi Arabia relations
Iran–Saudi Arabia proxy conflict